Edmund Thomas Daubeny (14 July 1840 – 20 August 1914) was an English first-class cricketer and clergyman.

The son of Edmund Joseph Daubeny, he was born at Paddington in July 1840. He was educated at Bromsgrove School, before going up to Magdalen College, Oxford. While studying at Oxford, he made seven appearances in first-class cricket for Oxford University between 1860 and 1863. Playing as a bowler, he took 26 wickets at an average of 15.05, with best figures of 5 for 35. These figures, which was his only five wicket haul, came against Southgate in 1863. After graduating from Oxford, Daubeny took holy orders in the Church of England. He was the rector of Market Weston in Norfolk in 1884. Daubeny died at South Acre in August 1914.

References

External links

1840 births
1914 deaths
People from Paddington
People educated at Bromsgrove School
Alumni of Magdalen College, Oxford
English cricketers
Oxford University cricketers
19th-century English Anglican priests
20th-century English Anglican priests